Unzipped is a 1995 American documentary film directed by Douglas Keeve. It follows fashion designer Isaac Mizrahi, Keeve's then boyfriend, as he plans and ultimately shows his fall 1994 collection. The film put such a rift in their relationship over Mizrahi's depiction that the two broke up over it.

There are appearances by supermodels Cindy Crawford, Naomi Campbell, Linda Evangelista and Kate Moss, as well as many other celebrities and designers from the fashion world and beyond.

Critical reception
Janet Maslin of The New York Times gave Unzipped a positive review. Calling the film a "crafty valentine to the fashion world in general and this irrepressible designer in particular", Maslin praised the film's tight structure and found Mizrahi an engaging personality. She concludes that Unzipped is a "smart, spiky documentary".

The film holds a rating of 78% on Rotten Tomatoes from 18 reviews.

References

External links
 

1995 films
Documentary films about fashion designers
Works about the fashion industry
1995 documentary films
American documentary films
1990s English-language films
1990s American films